Vernon River-Stratford was a provincial electoral district for the Legislative Assembly of Prince Edward Island, Canada. It was previously known as Belfast-Pownal Bay.

Members

Election results

Vernon River-Stratford, 2007–2019

2016 electoral reform plebiscite results

Belfast-Pownal Bay, 1996–2007

References

 Vernon River-Stratford information

Former provincial electoral districts of Prince Edward Island